Kiyan may refer to:
Kiyan, one of the mythical ancestors of the Mongols
Kiyan Isfahan FSC, Iranian football club
Kiyan Prince (1990–2006), English murder victim
Kiyan Soltanpour (born 1989), Azerbaijani-Iranian footballer
Kian Shahr, a city in Iran
Kiyan Bala, a village in Iran
Kiyan, Khuzestan, a village in Iran

See also
Kian (disambiguation)

Mongolian given names